Syamaprasad Institute of Technology & Management abbreviated as SITM is a private institution in Kolkata, West Bengal, India which offers undergraduate degree course in Bachelor of Computer Application. The college is affiliated to Maulana Abul Kalam Azad University of Technology(MAKAUT).

Departments
It was established in 2002 and offers admission to the following branch:
 Bachelor of Computer Application

References 

Engineering colleges in West Bengal
Universities and colleges in Kolkata
Colleges affiliated to West Bengal University of Technology
Educational institutions established in 2002
2002 establishments in West Bengal